Acanthothecis is a genus of lichen-forming fungi in the family Graphidaceae. The genus was circumscribed by Frederick Edward Clements in 1909.

Species

, Species Fungorum accepts 40 species of Acanthothecis.
Acanthothecis abaphoides 
Acanthothecis adjuncta 
Acanthothecis africana 
Acanthothecis alba  – Mexico
Acanthothecis aquilonia  – Australia
Acanthothecis archeri  – India
Acanthothecis asprocarpa 
Acanthothecis aurantiaca 
Acanthothecis aurantiacodiscus 
Acanthothecis bicellularis  – Brazil
Acanthothecis bicellulata  – Brazil
Acanthothecis borealis  – Australia
Acanthothecis celata  – India
Acanthothecis coccinea  – India
Acanthothecis collateralis  – India
Acanthothecis dialeuca 
Acanthothecis dialeucoides  – Thailand
Acanthothecis farinosa  – Brazil
Acanthothecis floridana  – United States
Acanthothecis floridensis  – United States
Acanthothecis fontana  – United States
Acanthothecis gracilis 
Acanthothecis gyridia 
Acanthothecis kalbii 
Acanthothecis latispora  – Brazil
Acanthothecis leucopepla 
Acanthothecis leucoxanthoides  – United States
Acanthothecis maritima  – Panama
Acanthothecis megalospora  – Brazil
Acanthothecis mosquitensis 
Acanthothecis multiseptata  – Brazil
Acanthothecis nivalis  – India
Acanthothecis norstictica  – Brazil
Acanthothecis oryzoides  – Brazil
Acanthothecis pachygraphoides 
Acanthothecis paucispora  – United States
Acanthothecis peplophora 
Acanthothecis poitaeoides 
Acanthothecis pruinocarpa 
Acanthothecis rimosa  – Brazil
Acanthothecis rosea 
Acanthothecis roseola  – Brazil
Acanthothecis salazinica  – Panama
Acanthothecis sarcographoides  – Brazil
Acanthothecis saxicola  – Brazil
Acanthothecis socotrana 
Acanthothecis subabaphoides  – Brazil
Acanthothecis subaggregans 
Acanthothecis subclavulifera 
Acanthothecis subconsocians  – India
Acanthothecis subfarinosa  – Brazil
Acanthothecis submuriformis  – Brazil
Acanthothecis tetraphora 
Acanthothecis verrucosa  – Vietnam
Acanthothecis virgulicola  – Tasmania
Acanthothecis yokdonensis  – Vietnam

References

 
Lichen genera
Ostropales genera
Taxa named by Frederic Clements
Taxa described in 1909